The Scale for the Assessment of Negative Symptoms (SANS) is a rating scale that mental health professionals use to measure negative symptoms in schizophrenia. Negative symptoms are those conspicuous by their absence—lack of concern for one's appearance, and lack of language and communication skills, for example. Nancy Andreasen developed the scale and first published it in 1984. SANS splits assessment into five domains. Within each domain it rates separate symptoms from 0 (absent) to 5 (severe). The scale is closely linked to the Scale for the Assessment of Positive Symptoms (SAPS), which was published a few years later. These tools are available for clinicians and for research.

Background
Schizophrenia is a severe mental illness characterized by a range of behaviors, including hallucinations and delusions. Hallucinations refer to disorders involving the sensory systems, and are most often manifested as seeing or hearing things (e.g., voices) that do not exist. Delusions include odd or unusual beliefs such as grandiosity or paranoia. Both hallucinations and delusions are inconsistent with reality. Other symptoms of schizophrenia include bizarre behavior, odd posture or movements, facial grimacing, loss of, or indifference to self-help skills (grooming, washing, toileting, feeding, etc.). Schizophrenia may also be marked by a host of social and communication deficits, such as social withdrawal, odd use of language, including excessive use of made up words (neologisms), incomprehensible combinations of words (word salad) or overall poverty of speech. The symptoms are often classified into two broad categories: positive and negative symptoms. Positive symptoms refer to those behaviors or condition that are present in schizophrenia but that are not present under typical conditions (hallucinations, delusions). Negative symptoms refer to those behaviors that are conspicuous because of their absence (grooming, language, communication). Several measures or rating scales have been developed to assess the positive and negative aspects of schizophrenia.

Items

Affective Flattening or Blunting
 Unchanging Facial Expression
 Decreased Spontaneous Movements
 Paucity of Expressive Gestures
 Poor Eye Contact
 Affective Nonresponsivity
 Lack of Vocal Inflections
 Global Rating of Affective Flattening
 Inappropriate Affect

Alogia
 Poverty of Speech
 Poverty of Content of Speech
 Blocking
 Increased Latency of Response
 Global Rating of Alogia

Avolition – Apathy
 Grooming and Hygiene
 Impersistence at Work or School
 Physical Anergia
 Global Rating of Avolition – Apathy

Anhedonia – Asociality
 Recreational Interests and Activities
 Sexual Interest and Activity
 Ability to Feel Intimacy and Closeness
 Relationships with Friends and Peers
 Global Rating of Anhedonia-Asociality

Attention
 Social Inattentiveness
 Inattentiveness During Mental Status Testing
 Global Rating of Attention
 Scale for the Assessment of Positive Symptoms (SAPS)

See also 
 Brief Psychiatric Rating Scale (BPRS)
 Diagnostic classification and rating scales used in psychiatry)±
 Positive and Negative Syndrome Scale (PANSS)
 Scale for the Assessment of Positive Symptoms (SAPS)

References
 Andreasen NC: Scale for the Assessment of Negative Symptoms (SANS) . Iowa City, University of Iowa, 1984;
 Andreasen NC. Negative symptoms in schizophrenia. Definition and reliability Arch Gen Psychiatry. 1982 Jul;39(7):784-8.

Psychosis screening and assessment tools